David Phetoe (1933 – 31 January 2018), was a South African actor. He is best known for the lead role "Paul Moroka" in the soap opera Generations.

Personal life
He had a brother, Molefe. He had two children including; Eugene.

He died on 31 January 2018 in Chris Hani Baragwanath Academic Hospital, Johannesburg, South Africa at the age of 85 after suffering from an undisclosed illness. The memorial service took place at the SABC studios in Johannesburg.

Career
He started career after joined with Dorkay House in Johannesburg. In 1959, he appeared in the play Nongogo produced by Athol Fugard. The show was performed at the Bantu Men’s Social Centre, but was later banned by the government. In 1979, he made film debut with the feature Game for Vultures and played the role "Matambo". Since then he acted in many films of various genre such as; Dragonard, Tusks, Bush Shrink, Ipi Tombi and A Good Man in Africa. In 1993, he joined with the original cast of SABC1 soap opera Generations. In the soapie, he played the role "Paul Moroka" for many years.

In the meantime, he appeared in the South African-American blockbuster drama film Cry, The Beloved Country which was based on a novel. In the film, he played the critics acclaimed role "Black Priest". He later acted in the comedy sitcom Sgudi Snayisi and many serials such as; Velaphi, Going Up, and Imvelaphi. In 2007, he was honored with the Lifetime Achievement Award at the Naledi Theatre Awards.

Filmography

References

External links
 IMDb

1933 births
2018 deaths
South African male film actors
20th-century South African male actors
South African male television actors
South African male stage actors